James Lockhart (born May 15, 1974) is an American politician who served in the Oklahoma House of Representatives from the 3rd district from 2010 to 2016.

References

1974 births
Living people
Democratic Party members of the Oklahoma House of Representatives